The 1929 NFL season was the tenth regular season of the National Football League. The league increased back to 12 teams with the addition of the Staten Island Stapletons, Orange Tornadoes and Minneapolis Red Jackets and the re-entry of the Buffalo Bisons. The Pottsville Maroons became the Boston Bulldogs, the New York Yankees folded, and the Detroit Wolverines merged into the New York Giants, with the Giants the surviving partner. 

On November 3, the Chicago Cardinals at Providence Steam Roller match became the first NFL game to be played at night under floodlights. Meanwhile, the Green Bay Packers were named the NFL champions after finishing the season with the best record.

Teams
The league increased back to 12 teams in 1929.

Rule changes
The NFL added the Field Judge as the fourth game official.

Championship race
Neither the Green Bay Packers nor the New York Giants lost a game during the first nine weeks of the season.  When they met at New York's Polo Grounds on November 24, 1929, the Packers were 9–0–0 and Giants were 8–0–1. "Whether New York or Green Bay, Wis., will hoist the 1929 National Professional Football league pennant to the top of the flagstaff will probably be determined here Sunday when the New York Giants and the Green Bay Packers, both undefeated teams, meet," an Associated Press report noted, adding "Although both the Packers and the Giants play other games before the end of the season, past performances indicated that tomorrow's game will be the crucial contest for the league's standings."

Verne Lewellen's pass to Herdis McCrary, and Bo Molenda's extra point, gave Green Bay a 7–0 lead in the first quarter.  A pass from Benny Friedman to Tony Plansky gave the Giants a chance to tie in the third quarter, but the point after was blocked, and New York trailed 7–6. Green Bay added two touchdowns in the last quarter to win the game, 20–6 to take a one-game lead. Neither team lost their remaining games; the Packers finished at 12–0–1, the Giants at 13–1–1, giving coach Curly Lambeau and the Packers their first league title.

The NFL introduced a scheduled championship game four years later, in 1933: a playoff game for the championship was played the previous season in 1932, but this counted in the final standings, and was also played indoors on a modified field.

Standings

References

 NFL Record and Fact Book
 NFL History 1921–1930 (Last accessed December 4, 2005)
 Total Football: The Official Encyclopedia of the National Football League

National Football League seasons